In Greek mythology, Sterope (Ancient Greek: Στερόπη, from , steropē, lightning), also called Asterope (Ἀστερόπη), was one of the seven Pleiades.

Biography 
Asterope was the daughter of Atlas and Pleione, born to them at Mount Cyllene in Arcadia. She was the wife of King Oenomaus of Pisa, or according to some accounts, his mother by Ares. Sterope was also credited to be the mother of Evenus (father of Marpessa) by the said Olympian god.

Other Use
 USS Sterope (AK-96) was a United States Navy Crater class cargo ship named after the star.
 Asterope is a name of the double star 21 Tauri and 22 Tauri in the Pleiades cluster of stars.
 233 Asterope is a T-type main belt asteroid

Notes

References 
 Lucius Mestrius Plutarchus, Moralia with an English Translation by Frank Cole Babbitt. Cambridge, MA. Harvard University Press. London. William Heinemann Ltd. 1936. Online version at the Perseus Digital Library. Greek text available from the same website.
 Pausanias, Description of Greece with an English Translation by W.H.S. Jones, Litt.D., and H.A. Ormerod, M.A., in 4 Volumes. Cambridge, MA, Harvard University Press; London, William Heinemann Ltd. 1918. Online version at the Perseus Digital Library
 Pausanias, Graeciae Descriptio. 3 vols. Leipzig, Teubner. 1903.  Greek text available at the Perseus Digital Library.
 Apollodorus, Apollodorus, The Library, with an English Translation by Sir James George Frazer, F.B.A., F.R.S. in 2 Volumes. Cambridge, Massachusetts, Harvard University Press; London, William Heinemann Ltd. 1921. . Online version at the Perseus Digital Library.

Pleiades (Greek mythology)
Nymphs
Women of Ares

Elean mythology